Omar Mbanza Mussa Rukundo (born 18 November 1980) is a Burundian former professional footballer who plays as a centre forward.

Career
Born in Bujumbura, Mussa played club football for Saint Louis, Berkenbos, Antwerp, Al-Wakrah, Patro Eisden Maasmechelen, Ronse and KRC Mechelen.

He also earned one cap for the Burundi national team in 2003.

References

1980 births
Living people
Sportspeople from Bujumbura
Burundian footballers
Saint Louis Suns United FC players
Royal Antwerp F.C. players
Al-Wakrah SC players
K. Patro Eisden Maasmechelen players
K.S.K. Ronse players
K.R.C. Mechelen players
Belgian Pro League players
Challenger Pro League players
Association football forwards
Burundian expatriate footballers
Burundian expatriates in Seychelles
Expatriate footballers in Seychelles
Burundian expatriate sportspeople in Belgium
Expatriate footballers in Belgium
Burundi international footballers